Ardisia willisii is a species of plant in the family Primulaceae. It is endemic to Sri Lanka.

Ecology
Coastal areas.

Uses
Fruit- edible; whole plant- medicinal; ornamental.

References
 http://plants.jstor.org/specimen/goet008144?history=true

Endemic flora of Sri Lanka
willisii